Springfield Airport may refer to:

 Springfield Airport (Massachusetts), an abandoned airfield in Springfield, Massachusetts, United States
 Springfield-Beckley Municipal Airport near Springfield, Ohio, United States (FAA/IATA: SGH)
 Springfield-Branson National Airport near Springfield, Missouri, United States (FAA/IATA: SGF)
 Springfield Robertson County Airport near Springfield, Tennessee, United States (FAA: M91)
 Lebanon-Springfield Airport near Springfield, Kentucky, United States (FAA: 6I2)

Other airports in places named Springfield:
 Abraham Lincoln Capital Airport near Springfield, Illinois, United States (FAA/IATA: SPI)
 Downtown Airport (Missouri) near Springfield, Missouri, United States (FAA: 3DW)
 Hartness State Airport near Springfield, Vermont, United States (FAA/IATA: VSF)
 Westfield-Barnes Regional Airport near Westfield/Springfield, Massachusetts, United States (FAA/IATA: BAF)
 Westover Metropolitan Airport near Springfield/Chicopee, Massachusetts, United States (FAA/IATA: CEF)

See also:
 Springfield Municipal Airport (disambiguation)